Damper Creek is a coastal locality in the Cassowary Coast Region, Queensland, Australia.

Geography 
Damper Creek is bounded to the east by the Hinchinbrook Channel which the mainland from the Hinchinbrook Island. The Bruce Highway passes from south to north through the locality. The North Coast railway line also passes from south to north through the locality, roughly parallel and to the east of the highway.

Most of the locality is low-lying coastal land which is relatively undeveloped apart from areas used for aquaculture. In the north-west and south-west corners of the locality, the land rises sharply into the Cardwell Range.

Heritage listings 

Damper Creek has a number of heritage-listed sites, including:
 Valley of Lagoons Road: Stone Bridge, Dalrymple Gap Track

References

Cassowary Coast Region
Coastline of Queensland
Localities in Queensland